Daring Youth is a 1924 American silent comedy-drama film directed by William Beaudine, starring  Bebe Daniels, Norman Kerry, and Lee Moran. It is loosely based on William Shakespeare's The Taming of the Shrew.

Plot
As described in a film magazine review, Mr. and Mrs. Allen have battled for the twenty-five years of their married life and Mrs. Allen is determined that her daughter Alita shall not lose romancethrough her marriage. She advocates the theory that wives and husbands should live together only three days each week and should keep their friends. Alita marries John J. Campbell under these conditions, but she soon tires of the system as does John, although neither will admit it. John finally is unable to stand it any longer and asserts himself by beating up his wife's escort. Alita is glad to consent to lead a conventional married life.

Cast

Status
With no prints of Daring Youth found in any film archives, it is a lost film.

References

External links

Still at gettyimages.com

1924 films
1924 comedy-drama films
American silent feature films
American black-and-white films
Films directed by William Beaudine
Films based on The Taming of the Shrew
Films produced by B. F. Zeidman
1924 lost films
Lost American films
Lost comedy-drama films
1920s American films
Silent American comedy-drama films
1920s English-language films
English-language comedy-drama films